Thomas Jordan Stevens (1848-1900) was a member of the Utah State legislature.

Early life
Stevens was born in England. He came to Utah in the Warren S. Snow company of 1864.

Political career
Stevens married Maria Stringham, a daughter of Bryant Stringham, who was a leadering herdman working under Brigham Young, often in charge of tithing office herds. They settled in downtown Salt Lake City in the Salt Lake 13th Ward of The Church of Jesus Christ of Latter-day Saints.

Stevens later became a prominent citizen of Ogden, Utah serving as bishop of the Ogden 5th Ward of the Church of Jesus Christ of Latter-day Saints, and treasurer of the Utah Territorial Reform School. He was also a member of the city council of Ogden and for a time the sheriff of Weber County, Utah. In 1895 he was elected to the Utah House of Representatives. He served as a member of the board of trustees of Weber Stake Academy (the predecessor of Weber State University) from 1888-1900. He also served on the commissary generals staff under Heber M. Wells. He was one of the residents of the Jefferson Avenue Historic District.

References

1848 births
1900 deaths
Politicians from Ogden, Utah
British emigrants to the United States
Utah city council members
School board members in Utah
Members of the Utah House of Representatives
19th-century American politicians